The Yesnaby Sandstone  Group is a Devonian lithostratigraphic group (a sequence of rock strata) in west Mainland Orkney, Scotland. The name is derived from the locality of Yesnaby where the strata are exposed in coastal cliffs.

Outcrops 
These strata are only exposed on either side of the Garthna Geo Fault in the Yesnaby area of west Mainland, Orkney.

Lithology and stratigraphy 
The Group comprises the Qui Ayre Sandstone and the Harra Ebb Sandstone. The basal beds are talus and alluvial fan facies deposited in a fluvial or lake marginal environment probably during the Emsian Stage of the Devonian Period.

References

External links 
 Yesnaby Geology Map

Geological groups of the United Kingdom
Geologic formations of Scotland
Devonian System of Europe
Givetian Stage
Stacks of Scotland
Sandstone formations
Siltstone formations
Conglomerate formations
Fluvial deposits
Lacustrine deposits